Napoleone Sommaruga (1848-1906)  was an Italian painter, active in Lombardy, painting mainly sacred subjects.

He was born in Milan, he exhibits in 1872, in Milan, a painting depicting: Choir of Gothic Chapel; Chapel of the Passion in the church of San Marco in Milan; Chapel of St Jerome in the Basilica of Sant'Eustorgio in Milan; Interior of the Duomo of Milan and Sacristy of the Canons;Sacristy of the Duomo; Interior of the Church of Sant'Alessandro of Milan, are two paintings exhibited in 1881 at the Brera Academy.  He also exhibited at the 1876 Centennial Exposition in Philadelphia.

References

1848 births
1906 deaths
19th-century Italian painters
Italian male painters
20th-century Italian painters
Painters from Milan
Italian vedutisti
19th-century Italian male artists
20th-century Italian male artists